BSC SWOT, or the Balanced Scorecard SWOT analysis, was first introduced, in 2001, by Lennart Norberg and Terry Brown.
 
BSC SWOT is a simple concept that combines the two powerful tools BSC (Balanced Scorecard) and SWOT analysis when identifying factors that drives or hinders strategy. The four perspectives in BSC is combined with the four dimensions of SWOT in a matrix where findings may be inserted.

Example:

To identify FINANCIAL (first perspective of the BSC) STRENGTHS (the first dimension of SWOT analysis).
Or to identify INTERNAL PROCESS (third perspective of the BSC) WEAKNESSES (the second dimension of SWOT analysis).

The full matrix looks like this:

The traditional SWOT analysis would look at external factors when looking at opportunities and threats. However the BSC SWOT would consider these attributes from both an external and internal perspective. Each field in the matrix may be looked upon as a question. For instance: 'What are my internal strengths?' or 'What opportunities do I have with my people?'. The BSC SWOT concept works best if a full understanding of BSC and SWOT analysis exists in order to create the right outcome.

Using BSC SWOT 

As this tool is more or less a matrix that captures findings it can be a time saver when developing strategy or when initiating such alternatives from a wider perspective. The ease of use and simple layout is its strengths. A full cycle when using this tool should not exceed 2 days. 

The BSC SWOT is used for several important purposes:

To refine a SWOT analysis that already exists
To facilitate a discussion in a general management team when clarifying strategic opportunities and/or pitfalls
When making a transition from a more traditional strategic planning to the Balanced Scorecard, also with the use of a Strategy map

The results from a BSC SWOT analysis is usually not a finished outcome. It must be further developed and refined in order to be actionable, for instance by developing a Strategy map. However its use will usually save a lot of time since it is far less time-consuming than a traditional SWOT for instance. Its design to match the use of Balanced Scorecard is specific to this purpose, but may be used as a generic tool when appropriate, for instance when analyzing the quality of current strategy or when investigating Causality relationships between different objectives.

See also 

Porter generic strategies
Strategy dynamics
Strategic management
Causality

References 

On BSC SWOT
T.S. Brown & L.J. Norberg, Balanced Scorecard Report, 2001, Building Executive Alignment, Buy-In, and Focus with the Balanced Scorecard SWOT.
S. F. Lee and K. K. Lo, e-Enterprise and management course development using strategy formulation framework for vocational education
Journal of Materials Processing Technology, Volume 139, Issues 1–3, 20 August 2003, pp. 604–612 Brian Kinahan, Tech Journal South, 2004, Instant Balanced Scorecard.

On the Balanced Scorecard
Kaplan R S and Norton D P (1992) "The balanced scorecard: measures that drive performance", Harvard Business Review Jan – Feb, pp. 71–80. 
Kaplan R S and Norton D P (1993) "Putting the Balanced Scorecard to Work", Harvard Business Review Sep – Oct, pp. 2–16. 
Kaplan R S and Norton D P (1996) "Using the balanced scorecard as a strategic management system", Harvard Business Review Jan – Feb, pp. 75–85.
Kaplan R S and Norton D P (1996) “Balanced Scorecard: Translating Strategy into Action” Harvard Business School Press
Kaplan, R. S., & Norton, D. P. (2004). Measuring the strategic readiness of intangible assets. Harvard Business Review, 82(2): 52–63.
Kaplan, R. S., & Norton, D. P. (2004). Strategy maps: Converting intangible assets into tangible outcomes. Boston: Harvard Business School Press.

Strategic management